AP-2 complex subunit alpha-2 is a protein that in humans is encoded by the AP2A2 gene.

Interactions 

AP2A2 has been shown to interact with EPN1 and SHC1.

References

Further reading

External links